Visočica may refer to:
 Visočica hill, a hill in Bosnia and Herzegovina near Visoko
 Visočica (mountain), a mountain in Bosnia and Herzegovina near Konjic
 Visočica River, a river in Bulgaria and Serbia